The following events occurred in January 1925:

January 1, 1925 (Thursday)
Norway's capital Christiania was renamed Oslo. 
In the 11th Rose Bowl, the Notre Dame Fighting Irish beat Stanford University, 27 to 10.
A small contingent of U.S. Marines arrived at Nanjing to patrol the vicinity of the university and protect Americans there from further looting.
Costa Rica decided to withdraw from the League of Nations over the League's failure to address regional disputes.
The states of Aleppo and Damascus were united into the State of Syria.
Born: Paul Bomani, politician and ambassador, in Musoma, Tanzania (d. 2005)

January 2, 1925 (Friday)
Fresh violence broke out around Italy as Benito Mussolini's crackdown on opposition newspapers continued. Fascists seized or attacked newspaper presses while at least three were killed in rioting. Mussolini met with King Victor Emmanuel III and requested dictatorial powers to quell the chaos. The king refused, but gave Mussolini tacit permission to act however he considered necessary within at least the appearance of constitutional legality. 
Leo Chiozza Money testified before Britain's Royal Commission that an increase in the world's population had led to the country's food situation becoming as desperate as it was during the war. "The 10 pence price of bread has doubled in recent years and looking into the future there are good prospects of its doubling again", he stated. Money recommended a "department of supply" be created to remedy the problem.
Born: Giacomo Furia, actor, in Naples, Italy (d. 2015); Larry Harmon, entertainer (Bozo the Clown), in Toledo, Ohio (d. 2008); Eraño de Guzman Manalo, 2nd Executive Minister (Tagapamahalang Pangkalahatan) of the Iglesia ni Cristo (Church of Christ), in San Juan City, Philippines (d. 2009)
Died: Nikola Petroff, 51, Bulgarian wrestler

January 3, 1925 (Saturday)
Benito Mussolini made a pivotal speech in the Italian Chamber of Deputies. He took personal responsibility for the actions of his Blackshirts, challenged his political opponents to remove him from office and then promised to take charge of restoring order to Italy within forty-eight hours. Historians now trace this speech to the beginning of Mussolini's dictatorship. 
Cyril Brownlie was sent off the field for foul play during a rough Test match against England during New Zealand's 1924–25 rugby union tour of Britain, Ireland and France. It was the first time such a severe sanction had ever been applied in an international rugby match. New Zealand won 17-11.

January 4, 1925 (Sunday)
Prefects throughout Italy received orders to control all "suspect" political organizations. Over the next two days, hundreds of private homes were searched, meeting halls were closed, political groups were disbanded and newspapers were seized. 
Adolf Hitler, whose Nazi Party had been banned in Bavaria since the failed Beer Hall Putsch, met with the state's Minister President Heinrich Held. Hitler pledged total loyalty to Held and offered to help him in his fight against communists.
Born: Veikko Hakulinen, cross-country skier, in Kurkijoki, Karelian ASSR (d. 2003)
Died: Nellie Cashman, 79 or 80, Irish-born prospector

January 5, 1925 (Monday)
The two ministers from the Liberal Party in Mussolini's cabinet, Gino Sarrocchi and Alessandro Casati, turned in their resignations. They were to be replaced by loyal Fascists, who were now the only party in Mussolini's Cabinet.
Nellie Tayloe Ross of Wyoming became the first female governor in United States History.

January 6, 1925 (Tuesday)
At the Finnish-American A.C. Games held at Madison Square Garden, Finnish runner Paavo Nurmi set two new indoor records in front of a standing-room only crowd. 
The German cruiser  was launched, the first large warship built in Germany since the end of the war.
Born: John DeLorean, car maker, in Detroit (d. 2005)

January 7, 1925 (Wednesday)
The new Al Jolson stage show Big Boy opened at the Winter Garden Theatre on Broadway.
Born: Gerald Durrell, English naturalist, zookeeper, author, and television presenter, in Jamshedpur, British India (d. 1995)

January 8, 1925 (Thursday)
A joint manifesto signed by the leaders of the parties "on the Aventine" condemned Mussolini's suppression of dissent, writing, "The whole country can bear witness to the fact that the pretext of this policy is a ridiculous lie as no conspiracy is threatening the country and no attempt has been made against the laws." The manifesto suggested that Mussolini resign.
Born: Helmuth Hübener, anti-Nazi youth activist, in Hamburg, Germany (d. 1942)
Died: George Bellows, 42, American artist

January 9, 1925 (Friday)
British economist George Paish said that another war in Europe was inevitable unless Germany's reparations payments were reduced and the French were to leave the Rhineland. He also warned that "Germany will not make the mistake she made the last time, in having Russia as an enemy, but will have that nation as a friend. Germany and Russia will be able to overrun Europe and establish a military despotism." 
Born: Lee Van Cleef, film actor, in Somerville, New Jersey (d. 1989)

January 10, 1925 (Saturday)
The Ku Klux Klan was banned from the state of Kansas when its Supreme Court ruled that it was a corporation organized for profit and therefore could not operate there without a charter.

January 11, 1925 (Sunday)
Beijing was seized by the combined forces of Sun Chuanfang and Qi Xieyuan.
The Chinese Communist Party opened its Fourth Congress in Shanghai.
Born: Grant Tinker, television executive, in Stamford, Connecticut (d. 2016)

January 12, 1925 (Monday)
In Chicago, the North Side Gang tried to kill Al Capone, using Tommy guns to rake his car with bullets as it idled outside a State Street restaurant. Only Capone's bodyguard was wounded as Capone himself was doing business inside, but the attack prompted him to order Tommy guns for his own men, as well as his famous bulletproof Cadillac.
The John Howard Lawson play Processional: A Jazz Symphony of American Life opened at the Garrick Theatre in New York.

January 13, 1925 (Tuesday)
25 were killed and 60 injured in a train crash in Westphalia, Germany.
Born: Georgi Kaloyanchev, actor, in Burgas, Bulgaria (d. 2012); Gwen Verdon, actress and dancer, in Culver City, California (d. 2000)

January 14, 1925 (Wednesday)
The Agreement Regarding the Distribution of the Dawes Annuities was signed in Paris among the Entente Powers, apportioning the distribution of the Central Powers' reparations payments, including those of Germany under the Dawes Plan, among the various countries that were entitled to the payments.
Born: Yukio Mishima, Japanese writer, in Shinjuku, Tokyo, Japan (d. 1970)
Died:  Camille Decoppet, 62, Swiss Federal Councilor;  Harry Furniss, 80, English cartoonist, illustrator and animation pioneer

January 15, 1925 (Thursday)
Hans Luther became Chancellor of Germany.
Soviet leader Joseph Stalin fired Leon Trotsky as Commisar for Military and Naval Affairs. He was replaced by Mikhail Frunze.

January 16, 1925 (Friday)
Blues artist Huddie Ledbetter, more popularly known as Lead Belly, was granted a full pardon by Texas governor Pat Morris Neff, having served the minimum seven years of his prison sentence after killing one of his own relatives in a fight over a woman. Neff had been impressed by a religiously-themed song about forgiveness that Lead Belly had written and performed for him during a visit he made to the prison the previous year.
Italy passed a new electoral bill containing a controversial provision for "plural voting".  Double votes were to be given to academians, professors, those with diplomas, knights, military officers, those with any military decorations, officeholders, certain business personnel, all those paying a direct tax of 100 lira or more, and fathers of at least five children. Triple votes were to be given to members of the royal family, members of high nobility, cardinals, highly decorated war veterans, high officeholders, or anyone who met three conditions for double votes. The opposition blasted the provision as disproportionately favouring the wealthy, but Mussolini contended that it would help to encourage educated and productive Italians.
Died: Aleksey Kuropatkin, 76, Russian general and Imperial Russian Minister of War

January 17, 1925 (Saturday)
Miriam A. Ferguson became the first female governor of Texas and the second in United States history.
Italy's Chamber of Deputies repealed the "plural voting" provision in the electoral bill passed the previous day. Mussolini consented to the change upon the advice of labour leaders within his party who feared it would draw too much resentment from the working class.
Born: Duane Hanson, sculptor, in Alexandria, Minnesota (d. 1996)

January 18, 1925 (Sunday)
"The Gentleman Bandit" Gerald Chapman was apprehended on a street in Muncie, Indiana. On his person he had $5,000 cash, $3,000 in bonds, $500 worth of jewelry, a pint of nitroglycerin, burglary tools and part of a sawed-through padlock.
Born: Gilles Deleuze, philosopher, in Paris (d. 1995)

January 19, 1925 (Monday)
The League of Nations opened the second session of the Second Opium Conference with the goal of reducing the worldwide trafficking and use of opium. 
German Chancellor Hans Luther and President Paul Löbe were mercilessly heckled to an unprecedented degree in the Reichstag as the new Cabinet was introduced and Luther outlined the new government's policies, including support for the Dawes Plan. Cries such as "traitor", "crook" and "monarchist" rang out from republican benches.
Died: Marie Sophie of Bavaria, 83, last Queen consort of the Kingdom of the Two Sicilies

January 20, 1925 (Tuesday)
The Soviet–Japanese Basic Convention was signed, in which Japan and the Soviet Union restored diplomatic relations and reached a number of agreements on matters that had previously been disputed between them, including that of the northern part of Sakhalin Island, which Japan agreed to withdraw from in exchange for oil and coal concessions.

January 21, 1925 (Wednesday)
Chancellor Hans Luther casually admitted in a speech to the Reichstag that his Cabinet had discussed changing the form of government, but had decided to remain a constitutional republic. The statement fueled charges from republicans that Luther was preparing to restore the German monarchy, as his Cabinet included several known monarchists.
The Soviet Union held mass demonstrations culminating in five minutes of silence in observation of the first anniversary of Vladimir Lenin's death.
Born: Charles Aidman, actor, in Frankfort, Indiana (d. 1993); Arnold Skaaland, professional wrestler and manager, in White Plains, New York (d. 2007)

January 22, 1925 (Thursday)
A radio telegram was sent out through the U.S. Army Signal Corps by Curtis Welch, the only doctor in Nome, Alaska, alerting all major towns in Alaska of an impending outbreak of diphtheria. Another was sent to the U.S. Public Health Service in Washington, D.C. explaining the desperate need for antitoxin.
The Richard Eichberg-directed German romance film The Motorist Bride was released.
Born: Katherine MacLean, American science fiction author (d. 2019)
Died: Fanny Bullock Workman, 66, American adventurer

January 23, 1925 (Friday)
A coup d'état in Chile overthrew the September Junta.
Born: Danny Arnold, actor and television writer-producer, in New York City (d. 1995)

January 24, 1925 (Saturday)
Chicago Outfit gangster Johnny Torrio survived an assassination attempt when Hymie Weiss and Bugs Moran jumped him as he and his wife were returning to their apartment from a shopping trip. Torrio was shot multiple times, but Moran's gun clicked empty when he tried to deliver a coup de grâce to Torrio's head. 
A total solar eclipse occurred.
Born: Gus Mortson, hockey player, in New Liskeard, Ontario, Canada (d. 2015)

January 25, 1925 (Sunday)
The tomb of Tutankhamun was reopened in Egypt so Howard Carter could resume his archaeological work. Carter was disappointed to find that the pall which had covered the sarcophagus was now ruined because someone in Egypt's antiquities department had carelessly stored it in a wooden shed that did not provide adequate protection from sunlight.
Died: Alexander Kaulbars, 80, Russian general and explorer

January 26, 1925 (Monday)
300,000 units of antitoxin were located in Anchorage, enough to contain the Alaskan diphtheria epidemic temporarily.
Born: Joan Leslie, actress and dancer, in Detroit (d. 2015); Paul Newman, actor, entrepreneur and activist, in Shaker Heights, Ohio (d. 2008)
Died: Caspar F. Goodrich, 78, American admiral; Sir James Mackenzie, 71, Scottish cardiologist

January 27, 1925 (Tuesday)
The January Junta was established to restore Arturo Alessandri to power in Chile.
A number of injuries were reported in Berlin as rioting broke out among monarchists, communists and republicans during demonstrations held on the birthday of former ex-kaiser Wilhelm II.
Alaskan Territorial Governor Scott Cordelle Bone gave the final authorization for a succession of dog sled teams to deliver the antitoxin to Nome to relieve the diphtheria epidemic, beginning the relay that would become known as the 1925 serum run to Nome.

January 28, 1925 (Wednesday)
A contingent of Russian mercenaries working for the Fengtian clique captured Shanghai with no resistance.
Actress Gloria Swanson married the French nobleman Henry de La Falaise in Paris.

January 29, 1925 (Thursday)
20 were killed and 20 wounded in Shanghai when representatives of the Fengtian Clique met resistance attempting to disarm about 1,000 defeated Jiangsu troops.
Born: Robert W. McCollum, virologist and epidemiologist, in Waco, Texas (d. 2010)

January 30, 1925 (Friday)
Turkish authorities exiled the Ecumenical Patriarch of Constantinople Constantine VI to Greece, to strong objections from the Greek public.
The Owencarrow Viaduct Disaster killed four when high winds blew a train off a viaduct in County Donegal, Ireland.

Cave explorer Floyd Collins was trapped in Sand Cave, Kentucky, when he dislodged a rock that fell and pinned his leg. Efforts to rescue him over the next eighteen days would become a subject of national media attention.
Antitoxin ran out in Nome as the serum run reached Kaltag.
Born: Douglas Engelbart, inventor and computing pioneer, in Portland, Oregon (d. 2013); Dorothy Malone, actress, in Chicago, Illinois (d. 2018)

January 31, 1925 (Saturday)
The dog sled team of Leonhard Seppala with lead dog Togo ran the longest and most perilous leg of the serum run, through the dark across the dangerous ice of Norton Sound.
Died: George Washington Cable, 80, American novelist

References

1925
1925-01
1925-01